
Gmina Iłowo-Osada is a rural gmina (administrative district) in Działdowo County, Warmian-Masurian Voivodeship, in northern Poland.

Villages
Gmina Iłowo-Osada contains the villages and settlements of Białuty, Białuty Kolonia, Brodowo, Chorap, Dwukoły, Dźwierznia, Gajówki, Iłowo-Osada, Iłowo-Wieś, Janowo, Kolonie Narzymskie, Krajewo, Kraszewo, Mansfeldy, Mławka, Narzym, Pruski, Purgałki, Sochy and Wierzbowo. Until 2003 it also included the village of Piekiełko, which is now a part of the town of Mława in neighbouring Masovian Voivodeship.

Neighbouring gminas
Gmina Iłowo-Osada is bordered by the town of Mława and by the gminas of Działdowo, Janowiec Kościelny, Kozłowo, Lipowiec Kościelny and Wieczfnia Kościelna.

References

Polish official population figures 2006

Ilowo-Osada
Gmina Ilowo Osada